The Faculty of Philosophy of the University of East Sarajevo abreviated as FFUIS is a constituent faculty of the University of East Sarajevo located in Pale, a university town twenty kilometers away from Sarajevo in Republika Srpska, Bosnia and Herzegovina. The Faculty is the largest organizational unit of the University of East Sarajevo. It is one of only five faculties of philosophy in the country.

History

Being formally established in early 1990’s in the context of devastating Bosnian War and ethnic separation caused by the Breakup of Yugoslavia, the Faculty nominally belongs to the group of newer institutions of higher education. The faculty was however not built from scratch as the completely new institution. The new faculty was de facto simply a dissociated Serb section of the pre-war Faculty of Humanities of the University of Sarajevo which was transferred from downtown Sarajevo to the Republika Srpska controlled neighboring settlements.

Due to the war, more than 600 professors and several thousand students had to leave Sarajevo. Prior to that the city was the main university center of the Yugoslav constituent Socialist Republic of Bosnia and Herzegovina. The group of university professors decided to renew the work of the Faculty of Philosophy in the Sarajevo suburbs where a large majority of Sarajevo Serbs sought refuge. Modest wartime preconditions have been established and the Serb section of the Sarajevo Faculty has started working again, despite substantial obstacles created by the conflict. Prior to that the city was the main university center of the Yugoslav constituent Socialist Republic of Bosnia and Herzegovina. The group of university professors decided to renew the work of the Faculty of Philosophy in the Sarajevo suburbs where a large majority of Sarajevo Serbs sought refuge. Modest wartime preconditions have been established and the Serb section of the Sarajevo Faculty has started working again, despite substantial obstacles created by the conflict.

On 16 September 2022 Faculty signed a cooperation agreement with the Institute for Contemporary History in Belgrade. As of 2022, the Faculty of Philosophy is the largest higher education institution within the University of East Sarajevo, with 19 study programs on the first cycle, 16 on the second and 3 study programs on the third cycle, with about 2,000 students.'

Study programs 
The Faculty of Philosophy is the largest units of the University of East Sarajevo, both in terms of the number of students and teaching staff. It also organizes the largest number of scientific disciplines among all of the faculties at the university.  Education at the Faculty of Philosophy is organized in line with Bologna Process into three distinct study cycles.  
At the Faculty of Philosophy students can study one of the study programs:
Philosophy 
Sociology and Social Work  
Journalism  
Political Science and International Relations  
History and Archaeology  
Pedagogy  
Psychology  
Elementary School Education  
Serbian Language and Literature  
Russian Language and Literature and International Relations  
General Literature and Librarianship  
General Literature and Theatrology  
English Language and Literature  
Chinese and English Language and Literature  
German Language and Literature  
Geography 
Mathematics and Computer Science  
Mathematics and Physics

See also
 Faculty of Humanities, University of Sarajevo
 List of split up universities
 University of Banja Luka
 Faculty of Humanities, University of Mostar
 Faculty of Philosophy, University of Belgrade
 Faculty of Humanities and Social Sciences, University of Zagreb

References

External links
 Homepage
 
 

Education in Bosnia and Herzegovina
Education in the Republic of Srpska
University of East Sarajevo